Mad Pride is a mass movement of the users of mental health services, former users, and the aligned, which advocates that individuals with mental illness should be proud of their 'mad' identity. Mad Pride activists seek to reclaim terms such as "mad", "nutter", and "psycho" from misuse, such as in tabloid newspapers, and in order to switch it from a negative view into a positive view.  Through  mass media campaigns, Mad Pride activists seek to re-educate the general public on the causes of mental disabilities, the experiences of those using the mental health system, and the global suicide pandemic. 

Mad Pride was formed in 1993 in response to local community prejudices towards people with a psychiatric history living in boarding homes in the Parkdale area of Toronto, Ontario, Canada, and an event has been held every year since then in the city except for 1996. A similar movement began around the same time in the United Kingdom. By the late 1990s similar events were being organized under the Mad Pride name around the globe, including Australia, Ireland, Portugal, Brazil, Madagascar, South Africa, France, South Korea and the United States. Events draw thousands of participants, according to MindFreedom International, a United States mental health advocacy organization that promotes and tracks events spawned by the movement

History
Mad studies grew out of mad pride and the psychiatric survivor framework, and focuses on developing scholarly thinking around "mental health" by academics who self-identify as mad. As noted in Mad matters: a critical reader in Canadian mad studies, "Mad Studies can be defined in general terms as a project of inquiry, knowledge production, and political action devoted to the critique and transcendence of psy-centred ways of thinking, behaving, relating, and being". Mad studies posits to offer "a critical discussion of mental health and madness in ways that demonstrate the struggles, oppression, resistance, agency and perspectives of Mad people to challenge dominant understandings of 'mental illness'". "Mad studies is a growing, evolving, multi-voiced and interdisciplinary field of activism, theory, praxis and scholarship."

The first known event, specifically organized as a Pride event by people who identified as survivors, consumers or ex-patients of psychiatric practices, was held on 18 September 1993, when it was called "Psychiatric Survivor Pride Day".

Founders 
Mad Pride's founding activists in the UK were Simon Barnet, Pete Shaughnessy, Robert Dellar , who have both passed since.

Books and Articles 
Mad Pride: A celebration of mad culture records the early Mad Pride movement. On Our Own: Patient-Controlled Alternatives to the Mental Health System, published in 1978 by Judi Chamberlin, is a foundational text in the Mad Pride movement, although it was published before the movement was launched.

Mad Pride was launched shortly before a book of the same name, Mad Pride: A celebration of mad culture, published in 2000. On May 11, 2008, Gabrielle Glaser documented Mad Pride in The New York Times. Glaser stated, "Just as gay-rights activists reclaimed the word queer as a badge of honor rather than a slur, these advocates proudly call themselves mad; they say their conditions do not preclude them from productive lives."

Culture and events

In many countries such as Canada, UK, and Ireland, Mad Pride and disability pride is celebrated in July. There is a connection to Bastille Day, July 14, the day of storming and freeing individuals from Bastille in Paris, France in 1789. That event is now considered a symbol of Mad Pride, representing liberation and freedom. 

The Mad Pride movement has spawned recurring cultural events in Toronto, London, Dublin and other cities around the world. These events often include music, poetry readings, film screenings, and street theatre, such as "bed push" protests, which aim to raise awareness about the poor levels of choice of treatments and the widespread use of force in psychiatric hospitals. Past events have included British journalist Jonathan Freedland, and popular novelist Clare Allan.  Mad Pride cultural events take a variety of forms, such as the South London collective Creative Routes, the Chipmunka Publishing enterprise, and the many works of Dolly Sen.

Bed push

A Bed Push is a method of activism employed by multiple mental health agencies and advocates as a method of raising awareness about psychiatric care. Activists wheel a gurney through public spaces to provoke discussion about mental health care. MindFreedom has a recipe for a successful Bed Push on their website, urging participants to remain peaceful but also be seen by blowing horns, slightly disrupting traffic and playing music. Often patients in psychiatric care feel silenced and powerless, showing resilience in the face of that and securing visibility is a method of regaining dignity.

Mad Pride Week in Toronto is proclaimed as such by the city itself. The festivities surrounding this week are highlighted by the Mad Pride Bed Push, typically on the 14th of July. The event takes place Toronto's Queen Street West "to raise public awareness about the use of force and lack of choice for people ensnared in the Ontario mental health system". This week is officially run by Toronto Mad Pride which partners a number of mental health agencies in the city. In recent years, some advocates have pushed for Parkdale, Toronto to be renamed MAD! Village, to reclaim pride in its surrounding communities' long history of struggle with mental health and addictions.

A series of bed push events take place around London each year.

Psychiatric Patient-Built Wall Tours 
The Psychiatric Patient-Built Wall Tours take place in Toronto, at the CAMH facility on Queen St West. The tours show the patient-built walls from the 19th century that are located at present day CAMH. The purpose of the tours is to give a history on the lives of the patients who built the walls, and bring attention to the harsh realities of psychiatry.

Geoffrey Reaume and Heinz Klein first came up with the idea of walking tours as part of a Mad Pride event in 2000. The first wall tour occurred on what is now known as Mad Pride Day, on July 14, 2000, with an attendance of about fifty people. Reaume solely leads the tours, and they have grown from annual events for Mad Pride, to occurring several times throughout the year in all non-winter months.

Mad Pride Today 
Mad Pride continues to grow with each event. July 16, 2022, in Burlington, VT. Vermonters who identify with the cause came to support it with a showing of speakers, musicians, and food vendors.

In the UK on July 14, 2022 70 individuals gathered outside Parliament Square to protest the treatment of patients in psychiatric institutions.

See also

 Anti-psychiatry
 Autistic Pride Day
 Brazilian anti-asylum movement
 Clifford Whittingham Beers
 Disability rights movement
 Disability flag
 Elizabeth Packard
 Functional diversity
 Icarus Project
 Involuntary commitment
 Judi Chamberlin
 Kate Millett
 Leonard Roy Frank
 Linda Andre
 List of psychiatric consumer/survivor/ex-patient related topics
 Lyn Duff
 Mentalism (discrimination)
 National Empowerment Center
 Neurodiversity
 Psychiatric survivors movement
 Ted Chabasinski
 World Network of Users and Survivors of Psychiatry
 David Reville

References

External links

 Mad Pride Toronto
 MAD Pride Australia

Anti-psychiatry
Health movements
History of mental health
Identity politics
Mental health organizations
Psychiatric survivor activists
1993 introductions